Yatangpu Township is an rural township in You County, Zhuzhou City, Hunan Province, People's Republic of China.

Cityscape
The township is divided into 10 villages and 2 communities, the following areas: Longhu Community, Xiejialong Community, Hongjiazhou Village, Nijiaoxiang Village, Maoping Village, Huangshuangqiao Village, Qiujialong Village, Niutouhu Village, Aolin Village, Tongba Village, Yangmugang Village, and Yinshangang Village (龙湖社区、谢家龙社区、洪家洲村、泥脚巷村、茅坪村、黄双桥村、邱家垅村、牛头湖村、奥林村、桐坝村、杨木港村、阴山港村).

References

Historic township-level divisions of You County